Noreen Margaret Corcoran (October 20, 1943 – January 15, 2016) was an American film and television actress. She is best known for playing Kelly Gregg in the American sitcom television series Bachelor Father.

Early years 
Corcoran was born in Quincy, Massachusetts, the third of eight children to William Henry "Bill" Corcoran, Sr. and Kathleen Hildegarde Corcoran (née McKenney). Her siblings, William Henry "Bill Jr.," Donna, Kerry, Hugh, Kevin, Brian and Kelly, all acted as children. She attended Fresno State University from 1962–1964, but did not graduate.

Acting career 
Corcoran began acting in 1951, appearing in the film Apache Drums, playing the role of the Child.

She also had roles in Dr. Kildare, Hans Christian Andersen, Channing, Gidget Goes to Rome, Cavalcade of America, Mr. Novak, and So This Is Love.

Ronald Reagan recommended Corcoran for the role of Kelly Gregg on the new CBS television series Bachelor Father. The series, about a wealthy bachelor raising his orphaned niece, ran from 1957 to 1962.

Corcoran's last role was in the television series The Big Valley.

Later life and death 
After retiring from acting, Corcoran worked at the Lewitzky Dance Company for over a decade. Ms. Corcoran never married nor had children. She died on January 15, 2016, of cardiopulmonary disease in Van Nuys, California, at the age of 72.

Filmography

Film

Television

References

External links 
 
 
 
 
 

1943 births
2016 deaths
20th-century American actresses
21st-century American actresses
Actresses from Massachusetts
American child actresses
American film actresses
American television actresses
California State University, Fresno alumni
People from Quincy, Massachusetts